Wexham is a civil parish in the county of Buckinghamshire in southern England. It is on the boundary of the unitary authority of Slough, its post town.  Wexham Park Hospital is a large hospital on the parish border and Burnham Beeches, a forest takes in small parts of its northern land.

History
The parish originally covered a relatively small  (1.2 square miles) according to the 1881 and 1891 censuses.

Wexham civil parish was divided under the Local Government Act 1972, with the southern part becoming part of Slough and the northern part becoming part of the present district. The northern part now constitutes the civil parish of Wexham, with the southern part having been a parish called Wexham Court. 

Wexham Court has a parish council with 11 members. It and some additional unparished territory formed the current (adjustable) three-member Slough Borough Council ward of Wexham Lea. 

In 2018 the parish of Wexham Court, and neighbouring Britwell were scheduled for abolition in April 2019, but after an appeal by the parish councils and a judicial review the order was quashed and the parishes remain unchanged.

The civil parish of Wexham includes in order of number of inhabitants: George Green, Middlegreen, and Wexham Street. It has protected green spaces comprising woodland, Langley Park and Black Park Country Park.

The village has a 12th-century parish church and the 16th century Wexham Court.

Demography

Education
The parish relies for its education on neighbouring villages with greater populations, save that the Japanese international boarding school Teikyo School United Kingdom is in Wexham.

See also

, a

References

External links
 Wexham Court Parish Council

Civil parishes in Buckinghamshire
Suburbs of Slough